Parenthood may refer to:
 Parenting, the process of being a parent
 Parenthood (film) (1989)
 Parenthood (1990 TV series)
 Parenthood (2010 TV series)
 Parenthood (television soundtrack)
 "Parent Hood", an episode of Robin Hood
 The Parent 'Hood, a 1990s American TV sitcom
 The Sims 4: Parenthood, a 2017 game pack for The Sims 4
 "Parenthood", a song by Reks from the 2012 album Straight, No Chaser